Fahd Richard Ndzengue Moubeti (born 7 July 2000) is a Gabonese professional footballer who plays as a winger for Slovenian side Tabor Sežana.

Club career
Ndzengue is a youth product of Mounana, and experienced international club football in the CAF Champions League and CAF Confederation Cup with the first team. He joined Tabor Sežana in 2019, and made his club debut in a 2–0 Slovenian PrvaLiga loss to Olimpija on 10 November 2019.

International career
Ndzengue debuted for the Gabon national team in a 2–1 2021 Africa Cup of Nations qualification loss to the Gambia on 16 November 2020.

At the youth level he played in the 2017 Africa U-17 Cup of Nations (and its qualifiers).

References

External links

2000 births
Living people
Sportspeople from Libreville
Gabonese footballers
Association football wingers
Association football forwards
Gabon youth international footballers
Gabon international footballers
CF Mounana players
NK Tabor Sežana players
Gabon Championnat National D1 players
Slovenian Second League players
Slovenian PrvaLiga players
Gabonese expatriate footballers
Gabonese expatriates in Slovenia
Expatriate footballers in Slovenia
21st-century Gabonese people